Szegedi Egységes Oktatási Labdarúgó Sport Club, commonly known as SZEOL SC, is a Hungarian association football club from the town of Szeged.

History
Szegedi Egységes Oktatási Labdarúgó SC debuted in the 2016–17 Nemzeti Bajnokság II season of the Hungarian League.

Managers
 Zoran Kuntić

References

External links
  
 Profile on Magyar Futball

 
Sport in Szeged
Football clubs in Hungary
1904 establishments in Hungary